Chromosome Seven Open Reading Frame 31 (C7orf31) is a protein that in humans is encoded by the C7orf31 gene on chromosome seven.

Gene/Locus
In humans, the C7orf31 gene is located at the locus 7p15.3   and stretches between position 25174316 and 25219817 (span 45502 bp).  It codes for at least 4 unique human isoforms: the primary isoform (590 aa; also denoted X1, X2, and CRA_c), isoform X4 (346 aa), isoform CRA_a (580 aa), and isoform CRA_b (380 aa).

Transcript
In humans, C7orf31 codes for an mRNA strand that is 3609 base pairs long.  The human mRNA is composed of a 5' untranslated region that is 561 bases and a 3' untranslated region that is 1275 bases long.

Protein
The primary protein encoded by C7orf31 in humans is 590 amino acids long with molecular weight 38334 Da.  The protein is part of a functionally uncharacterized family of proteins (pfam15093) with a domain of unknown function (DUF4555).

Protein Orthology
The C7orf31 protein is well-conserved in mammals and birds, but is less conserved in more distant organisms.

C7orf31 does not have any paralogs in humans.

Expression
In humans, C7orf31 is predicted to be localized in the cytosol, nucleus, mitochondrion, and peroxisome, and it is expressed in almost all tissues.  It is highly expressed especially in the testes.

Interaction
Two-hybrid studies have found interactions between the proteins encoded by A8K5H9 and C7orf31,
 and another study has found the protein to interact with KBTBD5.

A study in 2014 found C7orf31 to be a candidate as a centrosome-associated protein, using mass spectrometry on mammalian sperm cells’ centrioles.  The protein appears in the study alongside seven other centrosome-associated protein candidates.  Along with 2241 other proteins, C7orf31 also exhibited significant binding in a microarray experiment to β-amyloids, a group of proteins associated with Alzheimer's disease.  Finally, in a protein-protein interaction network study, C7orf31 was found to associate with KLHL40, whose exact function is also not known.

References

External links 
 

Genes on human chromosome 7
Uncharacterized proteins